Sathiyamangalam may refer to:

Sathyamangalam, a town and municipality in Erode district, Tamil Nadu
Sathiyamangalam, Pudukkottai, a village in Pudukkottai district, Tamil Nadu, India
Sathiyamangalam, Thanjavur, a village in Thanjavur district, Tamil Nadu, India
Sathiyamangalam, Viluppuram, a village in Viluppuram district, Tamil Nadu, India